Leasi Papali'i Tommy Scanlan is a Samoan diplomat who, since  April 2012, has served as high commissioner of the Independent State of Samoa to New Zealand, in which capacity he is also dean of the diplomatic corps. He was previously governor of the Central Bank of Samoa from 1989 to 2011.

References

External links
 Photo of Scanlan in 2012 with Sir Jerry Mateparae

Samoan diplomats
Year of birth missing (living people)
Living people
Governors of Central Bank of Samoa
New Zealand–Samoa relations
High Commissioners of Samoa to New Zealand
University of Canterbury alumni